Monument station may refer to:
Monument Metro station, a Tyne and Wear Metro in Newcastle
Bank and Monument stations, linked London Underground stations
Monument station (Massachusetts), a former railway station in Monument, Massachusetts
Monument (MBTA station), a closed light rail stop in Boston, Massachusetts

See also 
Monumento station, a Manila LRT station in Caloocan